Gwendolyne Bolivar Fourniol (born 11 June 2000) is a Filipino-French model, teacher and beauty pageant titleholder who was crowned Miss World Philippines 2022. She will represent the Philippines at the Miss World 2023 pageant.

Early life and education
Fourniol was born and raised in France to a Filipina mother Sim Fourniol (née Bolivar) from Himamaylan, Negros Occidental and French father Thierry Fourniol. She is pursuing her bachelor's degree in economics from the Oxford Brookes University in London, England.

Pageantry

Miss World Philippines 2021
She joined the Miss World Philippines 2021 pageant and finished as a Top 15 semifinalist.

Miss World Philippines 2022
She joined the Miss World Philippines 2022 pageant and won. She also bagged the Best in Evening Gown, Love Your Skin Award, and Miss Silka awards.

Miss World 2023
She will represent the Philippines at the Miss World 2023 pageant.

References

External links

Living people
2000 births
Miss World 2022 delegates
Miss World Philippines winners
Filipino female models
Filipino people of French descent
French people of Filipino descent
French female models
People from Paris
People from Negros Occidental